Cybill Lynne Shepherd (born February 18, 1950) is an American actress and former model. Her film debut and breakthrough role came as Jacy Farrow in Peter Bogdanovich's coming-of-age drama The Last Picture Show (1971) alongside Jeff Bridges. She also had roles as Kelly in Elaine May's The Heartbreak Kid (1972), Betsy in Martin Scorsese's Taxi Driver (1976), and Nancy in Woody Allen's Alice (1990).

On television, her first major role was as Colleen Champion in the one season of the night-time drama The Yellow Rose (1983). Shepherd played Madeline Hayes on the detective comedy-drama Moonlighting (1985–1989) opposite Bruce Willis, for which she won two Golden Globes for Best Actress in a Comedy/Musical TV Series out of three such nominations. She later starred as Cybill Sheridan on Cybill (1995–1998), for which she won her third Golden Globe Award as Best Actress in a Comedy/Musical TV series. Her later television roles included Phyllis Kroll on The L Word (2007–2009), Madeleine Spencer on Psych (2008–2013), Cassie in the television film The Client List (2010), and Linette Montgomery on The Client List (2012–2013).

Early life and career
Shepherd was born February 18, 1950, in Memphis, Tennessee. She is the second of three children. She had an older sister, Terry, and has a younger brother, William. Cybill was named using a name blend that referred to her grandfather Cy and her father, Bill. While attending East High School, Shepherd won the "Miss Teenage Memphis" title and represented the city at the 1966 Miss Teenage America pageant at age 16, where she won the congeniality award. She competed at the 1968 "Model of the Year" contest at age 18, making her a fashion star of the 1960s and resulting in fashion model assignments through high school and afterward.

According to Shepherd's autobiography, a 1970 Glamour magazine cover caught the eye of film director Peter Bogdanovich. His then-wife, Polly Platt, claimed that when she saw the cover in a check-out line in a Ralphs grocery store in southern California, he said "That's Jacy," referring to the role Bogdanovich was casting—and ultimately given to Shepherd—in The Last Picture Show (1971).

First experience of fame
Her first film was The Last Picture Show, also starring Jeff Bridges and Timothy Bottoms. The film became a critical and box office hit, earning eight Academy Awards nominations and winning two. Shepherd was nominated for a Golden Globe. Shepherd was cast opposite Charles Grodin in The Heartbreak Kid (1972). She played Kelly, a young woman for whom Grodin's character falls while on his honeymoon in Miami. Directed by Elaine May, it was another critical and box office hit. Also in 1972, Shepherd posed as a Kodak Girl for the camera manufacturer's then-ubiquitous cardboard displays.

In 1974, Shepherd again teamed up with Peter Bogdanovich for the title role in Daisy Miller, based on the Henry James novella. The film—a period piece set in Europe—was a box office failure. That same year, she launched a singing career, releasing a studio album Cybill Does It...To Cole Porter for MCA Records. It was panned by Village Voice critic Robert Christgau, who wrote: "Her voice is surprisingly pleasant, but you'd never know how these songs sparkle.

In 1975, she made her next film, At Long Last Love, a musical that was directed by Bogdanovich, but, like Daisy Miller, it flopped. Shepherd returned with good reviews for her work in Martin Scorsese's Taxi Driver (1976). According to Shepherd, Scorsese had requested a "Cybill Shepherd type" for the role. She portrayed an ethereal beauty with whom Robert De Niro's character, Travis Bickle, becomes enthralled.

A series of less-successful roles followed, including The Lady Vanishes, a remake of Alfred Hitchcock's 1938 film of the same name. Already sitting in on an acting class taught by Stella Adler, Shepherd was offered work at a dinner theater in Norfolk, Virginia, and turned to friend Orson Welles for advice. He encouraged her to get experience on stage in front of an audience, anywhere but Los Angeles or New York City, away from the harsh big-city critics and so she moved back to her home town of Memphis to work in regional theatre.

Return to Hollywood
In 1982, Shepherd returned to New York and to the stage when she played alongside James MacArthur in a theatre tour of Lunch Hour by Jean Kerr. The following year, Shepherd went back to Los Angeles and was cast as Colleen Champion in the night-time drama The Yellow Rose (1983), opposite Sam Elliott. Although critically acclaimed, the series lasted only one season. A year later, Shepherd was cast as Maddie Hayes on Moonlighting (1985–1989), which became the role that defined her career. The producers knew that her role depended on having chemistry with her co-star, and she was involved in the selection of Bruce Willis. A lighthearted combination of mystery and comedy, the series won Shepherd two Golden Globe Awards.

She starred in Chances Are (1989) with Robert Downey Jr. and Ryan O'Neal, receiving excellent reviews. She then reprised her role as Jacy in Texasville (1990), the sequel to The Last Picture Show (1971), as the original cast (and director Peter Bogdanovich) reunited 20 years after filming the original. She appeared in Woody Allen's Alice (1990) and Eugene Levy's Once Upon a Crime (1992), as well as several television films. In 1997, she won her third Golden Globe award for Cybill (1995–1998), a television sitcom in which the title character, Cybill Sheridan, an actress struggling with hammy roles in B movies and bad soap operas, was loosely modeled on herself (including portrayals of her two ex-husbands).

In 2000, Shepherd's bestselling autobiography, Cybill Disobedience: How I Survived Beauty Pageants, Elvis, Sex, Bruce Willis, Lies, Marriage, Motherhood, Hollywood, and the Irrepressible Urge to Say What I Think, written in collaboration with Aimee Lee Ball, was published. That same year, Shepherd hosted a short-lived syndicated talk show version of the book Men Are from Mars, Women Are from Venus, but left the show in early 2001. In 2003, she guest-starred on 8 Simple Rules as the sister of Cate Hennessy (portrayed by Katey Sagal). She has played Martha Stewart in two television films: Martha, Inc.: The Story of Martha Stewart (2003) and Martha: Behind Bars (2005).

From 2007 until it ended, Shepherd appeared on The L Word as Phyllis Kroll for the show's final three seasons. In 2008, she joined the cast of Psych as main character Shawn Spencer's mother, Madeleine Spencer. On November 7, 2008, Shepherd guest-starred in a February episode of the CBS drama Criminal Minds. In 2010 Shepherd appeared in an episode of No Ordinary Family and in November of the same year she guest-starred in an episode of $♯*! My Dad Says.

Shepherd appeared alongside Jennifer Love Hewitt in the 2010 television film The Client List and then in the 2012-13 series based on the film.

In July 2012, Shepherd made her Broadway debut in the revival of Gore Vidal's The Best Man at the Gerald Schoenfeld Theatre alongside James Earl Jones, John Stamos, John Larroquette, Kristin Davis, and Elizabeth Ashley to positive reviews.

Shepherd appeared as a mother grieving the death of her daughter in Do You Believe? (2015), a Christian-themed movie produced by Pure Flix Entertainment.

In 2023, Shepherd starred in the Lifetime film How to Murder Your Husband: The Nancy Brophy Story, where she portrayed Nancy Brophy, opposite Steve Guttenberg as Daniel Brophy, in a dramatization of the Murder of Daniel Brophy.

Political activism

Throughout her career, Shepherd has been an outspoken activist for issues such as gay rights and abortion rights. In 2009, she was honored by the Human Rights Campaign in Atlanta with one of two National Ally for Equality awards. She has been an advocate for same-sex marriage.

She was present at the opening of the National Civil Rights Museum in her hometown of Memphis, to which she lent financial support.

Personal life
In her autobiography, Shepherd revealed that she called her mother in 1978, crying and unhappy with the way her life and career were going. Her mother replied, "Cybill, come home." Shepherd went home to Memphis, where she met and began dating David M. Ford, a local auto parts dealer and nightclub entertainer. She became pregnant, and the couple married that year. Their daughter, Clementine Ford, was born in 1979. The marriage ended in divorce in 1982.

In 1987, Shepherd became pregnant by chiropractor Bruce Oppenheim and married him. They had twins named Ariel and Zachariah Shepherd Oppenheim born during the fourth season of Moonlighting. The couple divorced in 1990.

In June 2012, Shepherd became engaged to psychologist Andrei Nikolajevic. By 2015, the engagement had been called off.

Religious beliefs
Shepherd was raised Christian, but stated that she eventually "lost touch" with the religion. In a 2007 interview with Metro Weekly, she described herself as being "a goddess-worshipping Christian Pagan Buddhist".

In October 2014, Shepherd said that she had reconnected with her Christian faith.

Awards

Emmy Awards
Nominations:
 1986 - Outstanding Lead Actress - Drama Series - Moonlighting
 1995 - Outstanding Lead Actress - Comedy Series - Cybill
 1996 - Outstanding Lead Actress - Comedy Series - Cybill
 1997 - Outstanding Lead Actress - Comedy Series - Cybill

In her autobiography, Shepherd addressed rumors that she was jealous of her co-stars Bruce Willis and Christine Baranski for winning Emmy awards while she has not: "The grain of truth in this controversy was that of course I was envious. Who doesn't want to win an Emmy?"

Golden Globe Awards
Wins:
 1985 - Best Actress in a TV series, Comedy/Musical - Moonlighting
 1986 - Best Actress in a TV series, Comedy/Musical - Moonlighting
 1995 - Best Actress in a TV series, Comedy/Musical - Cybill

Nominations:
 1971 - Most Promising Newcomer (Female) - The Last Picture Show
 1987 - Best Actress in a TV series, Comedy/Musical - Moonlighting
 1996 - Best Actress in a TV series, Comedy/Musical - Cybill

Filmography

Film

Television

Discography
 Cybill Does It...To Cole Porter (Paramount, 1974)
 Mad About the Boy (Tombstone, 1976)
 Cybill Getz Better (Inner City, 1976)
 Vanilla (Gold Castle, 1979)
 Somewhere Down the Road (Gold Castle, 1990)
 Talk Memphis to Me (Drive Archive, 1997)
 Songs from The Cybill Show (1999)
 Live at the Cinegrill (2001)
 At Home With Cybill (2004)
 Jazz Baby Volumes 1–3 (2005)

Appearances
 At Long Last Love (soundtrack) (1975)
 Moonlighting (soundtrack) (1987)

Notes

References

External links

 
 
 
 

1950 births
Living people
Actresses from Memphis, Tennessee
American female models
American women jazz singers
American jazz singers
American film actresses
American abortion-rights activists
American stage actresses
American television actresses
American television producers
American women television producers
American beauty pageant winners
Best Musical or Comedy Actress Golden Globe (television) winners
American LGBT rights activists
MCA Records artists
American television talk show hosts
University of Southern California alumni
Stella Adler Studio of Acting alumni
20th-century American actresses
21st-century American actresses
American autobiographers
Women autobiographers
20th-century American women writers
20th-century American non-fiction writers
Female models from Tennessee
Singers from Tennessee
American women non-fiction writers
Jazz musicians from Tennessee
Inner City Records artists
GLAAD Media Awards winners
Writers from Memphis, Tennessee